The Toro people, Tooro people or Batooro are a Bantu ethnic group, native to the Tooro Kingdom, a subnational constitutional monarchy within Uganda.

Population
 the following administrative districts constitute the Tooro Kingdom: (a) Kabarole District (b) Kamwenge District (c) Kyegegwa District and (d) Kyenjojo District. Those four districts had a combined total population of about 1 million people, according to the 2002 national population census.

Culture 
Since Fort Portal Tourism city is the headquarter of Tooro Kingdom, the area has two inscribed elements of Empaako and Koogere oral traditions on UNESCO's list of Intangible Cultural Heritage in Need of Urgent Safeguarding.

Prominent people 
The following individuals are some of the prominent Batooro:
 Elizabeth Bagaya - She is a lawyer, politician, diplomat, model and actress. She was the first female East African to be admitted to the English Bar. She is a paternal aunt of the current King of Toro, Oyo Nyimba Kabamba Iguru Rukidi IV. 
 Edward Bitanywaine Rugumayo - He is a politician, diplomat, author, academic and environmentalist. Current University Chancellor of Kampala University and of Mountains of the Moon University
 Brigadier Nobel Mayombo (1965–2007) - He was military officer in the UPDF and a Member of Parliament (MP).
 Andrew Mwenda - Journalist and entrepreneur. Founder and owner of The Independent, a current affairs newsmagazine.
 Brigadier Kayanja Muhanga - He is an army officer. He currently serves as the Commander of the UPDF Contingent in South Sudan. He was appointed to that position in January 2014 by General Yoweri Museveni, the Commander in Chief of the UPDF and the President of Uganda.
 Professor John Ntambirweki - A lawyer, academic and academic administrator. He is the current Vice Chancellor of Uganda Pentecostal University, a private university, located in Fort Portal, Western Uganda.
 Dr. Godfrey Bahiigwa - Economist and entrepreneur. Director of Agriculture and Rural Development at the African Union Commission in Addis Ababa, Ethiopia.

See also
 Bunyoro
 Buganda
 Busoga
 Toro Kingdom

References

External links
 Toro People

 

 
Ethnic groups in Uganda